Pulgar is a Spanish municipality in the Province of Toledo.

Geography
It borders five other municipalities in the Province of Toledo: Noez, Mazarambroz, Las Ventas con Peña Aguilera, Cuerva and Totanés.

Demography
The following table shows the evolution of the number of inhabitants between 1996 and 2006 according to data from the INE.

References

This article includes content from the Spanish Wikipedia article Pulgar (Toledo).

Municipalities in the Province of Toledo